Book of Virtue may refer to:

 Book of Aram, one of the books of the Tirukkural, a Tamil classic work of the Sangam literature
 Tao Te Ching, a Chinese classic text traditionally credited to Laozi